Tuller is a surname of German origin, with several different meanings. Notable people with the surname include:

Annita Tuller (1910-1994), American mathematician
Horst Tüller (1931-2001), German road and track cyclist
James Tuller, American police superintendent
Tamir Tuller, Israeli engineer, computer scientist, and systems and synthetic biologist

See also
Hotel Tuller, a hotel in Detroit, Michigan
Tiller (disambiguation)
Toller (disambiguation)